The Vought XF2U was a prototype biplane fighter aircraft evaluated by the United States Navy at the end of the 1920s, but was already outclassed by competing designs and never put into production.

Development and design
Vought's O2U Corsair, first delivered in 1927, was a successful design that set several speed and altitude record in that year. To compete for the Bureau of Aeronautics requirement for a two-seat carrier-based fighter, Vought adapted this design, but progress was slow. Ordered on 30 June 1927, the aircraft was not completed until June 1929. It was no longer state-of-the-art; in particular Curtiss' F8C Falcon was further along.

The aircraft was constructed of welded steel tubing, covered in fabric. The wings were made of wood and fabric covered. The prototype first flew on 21 June 1929, and was tested on a simulated carrier deck in Norfolk, Virginia. It was found satisfactory, allaying concerns about problems due to the rather long cowling over the engine. The aircraft then went to the Naval Aircraft Factory, who operated it until 6 March 1931, when it was lost in a crash landing.

Specifications

References

Further reading

External links

 Vought page on the XF2U

F02U
Vought F02U
Single-engined tractor aircraft
Biplanes